Gaolan Island is an island in Zhuhai, Guangdong, China. It spans an area of 34.39 km2 and has a coastline of 34.9 km. The island is famous for its beaches and rock paintings, dating to the Late Neolithic. It is located about 50 kilometers southwest of Zhuhai city.

References

Islands of Zhuhai
Late Neolithic
Populated places in China
Islands of China